HD 146624 (d Scorpii) is a single, white-hued star in the southern zodiac constellation of Scorpius. It is faintly visible to the naked eye, having an apparent visual magnitude of 4.80. At that distance, the visual magnitude is reduced by an extinction of 0.17 due to interstellar dust. It is a member of  the Beta Pictoris moving group, a set of ~12 million year old stars that share a common motion through space.

This is an A-type main-sequence star with a stellar classification of A0 V, and is suspected to be chemically peculiar. It is a young star, just 10 million years old, with a projected rotational velocity of 39 km/s. The mass of the star is greater than the Sun's, with De Rosa et al. It has 1.60 times the Sun's radius and shines with 21 times the Sun's luminosity from its photosphere at an effective temperature of 9,441 K.

The star displays an infrared excess, suggesting a circumstellar disk of orbiting material.

References

A-type main-sequence stars
Circumstellar disks
Beta Pictoris moving group
Scorpius (constellation)
Scorpii, d
Durchmusterung objects
146624
079881
6070